Claire Navez (born 6 October 1987 at Niort) Is a French athlete specializing in the middle distances, running for club  SCO sainte-marguerite Marseille.

Biography 
She won four times the title of champion of France on the short cross (Cross Country long race) between 2011 and 2015.

During the Indoor Athletics Championships in France in 2012, Claire Navez imposed herself on the 1500 meters, running 4 min 22 sec 71, later in the season, she became champion of France at the 3000 meter steeplechase.

She married Bastien Perraux in September 2012 and therefore appears later in the balances under the name Claire Perraux.

Prize list 
 Champion of France of  cross court (Cross Country long race) in 2011, 2012, 2013 and 2015   
 France champion in 1500m Indoors in 2012 and 2015   
 Champion of France 3000 m steeplechase in 2012   
 Vice-champion of France of the  cross court (Cross Country long race) in 2008   
 3rd in French championship cross court (Cross Country long race) in 2016

Records

Notes and references

External links  
 

1987 births
Living people
People from Niort
French female middle-distance runners
French female steeplechase runners
Sportspeople from Deux-Sèvres